Aquinas Walter Richard Sipe (December 11, 1932 – August 8, 2018) was an American Benedictine monk-priest for 18 years (1952–1970 at Saint John's Abbey, Collegeville, Minnesota), a psychotherapist and the author of six books about Catholicism, the clerical sexual abuse in the Catholic Church, and clerical celibacy.

Life

Born in Robbinsdale, Minnesota, Sipe was an American Certified Clinical Mental Health Counselor trained specifically to treat Roman Catholic priests. He practiced psychotherapy, "taught on the faculties of Major Catholic Seminaries and colleges, lectured in medical schools, and served as a consultant and expert witness in both civil and criminal cases involving the sexual abuse of minors by Catholic priests". During his training and therapies, he conducted a 25-year ethnographic study published in 1990 about the sexual behavior of supposed celibates, in which he found more than half had sexual relationships. In 1970, after receiving a dispensation from his vows as a priest, Sipe married a former nun, Marianne; they had a son.

Sipe was a witness in more than 57 lawsuits, testifying on behalf of victims of child sexual abuse by Catholic priests.

Sipe died on August 8, 2018, of multiple organ failure in La Jolla, California, at age 85.

Media coverage

Sipe participated in 12 documentaries on celibacy and priest sexual abuse aired by HBO, BBC, and other networks in the United States, United Kingdom, and France, and was widely interviewed by media, including CNN, ABC, NBC, CNBC, The New York Times, the Los Angeles Times, People magazine, Newsweek and USA Today. On January 21, 1995, he made an extended appearance on a special edition of the British television discussion program After Dark, alongside Garret FitzGerald and Sinéad O'Connor, among others.

In popular culture
Sipe's research and his book Sex, Priests and Power are depicted in Tom McCarthy's 2015 film Spotlight as crucial in the Boston Globe'''s Pulitzer Prize–winning 2002 investigation of predatory priests and the decades-long cover-up of their crimes by the Roman Catholic Archdiocese of Boston. The 1995 book is shown onscreen in its bright-red-covered hardback edition when the investigative team meet the first victim, Phil Saviano, the founder of the New England chapter of SNAP. As a favor to McCarthy, actor Richard Jenkins, who starred in McCarthy's 2007 film The Visitor, performed uncredited as Sipe's voice in three phone calls, each based on real-life conversations with Spotlight reporters, including a conference call that is a turning point in the investigation: Sipe made the metric calculation that 6% of priests are pedophiles, which the investigative team's subsequent research verifies.

Abuse in Burlington diocese

In a May 2009 study, Sipe found that there were extensive problems in the sexual behavior of Burlington, Vermont, Catholic clergy. He examined the records of 102 priests "whose records were available" between 1950 and 2002. He claimed that, of this group, 23 priests were sexually involved with children under age 13, 15 were reported for involvement with married women and 19 were said to have had sexual relationships with adult men. He asserted that 49 could be said to have a homosexual orientation.

Research on homosexuality

A number of small-scale studies by Sipe and others have not found evidence that homosexuals are more likely to break the vow of celibacy than heterosexuals."Facts About Homosexuality and Child Molestation"  from UC Davis

Statements
Sipe has said, "There are a pope or two who have resigned, several hundred have been murdered, but it's a very stable organization from the top down. What other monarchy do you know that's lasted for 2,000 years?" Contrary to Sipe's calculations, only seven popes have been murdered, with another 28 martyred in the church's early days; indeed, there have only been 266 popes. According to Sipe, "the most valuable development since 2000 has been the open exposure of the misbehavior of priests and religious. This has been one element that alerts not just Catholics but members of other religious groups to the potential sexual dangers posed by men and women in positions of power over young people. The church has contributed to the education about child abuse and the need for prevention of abuse and to provide education for protection for all children and the vulnerable. Unfortunately the efforts of the Catholic Church have been forced on them by the public outcry, victims’ testimony, and the legal system that calls bishops and religious superiors to account for their gross neglect, conspiracies to conceal crimes, and fraud to keep abuse secret. It is an ongoing fight to keep the church honest. Catholic laymen and women (Governor Frank Keating and Chief Justice Anne Burke) who have worked closely with church officials say that the bishops do not want to change, but only want 'business as usual.' The encouraging thing is that people do not accept the word of bishops as true, necessary or important anymore. Over thirty percent of men and women brought up as Catholic no longer identify themselves as Catholic."

Books by Sipe
 Courage at Three AM (a book of poetry), FriesenPress, August 3, 2017, 72 pages 
 A Secret World: sexuality and the search for celibacy, Routledge, 1990, 324 pages
 Sex, Priests, and Power: anatomy of a crisis, Routledge Mental Health, 1995, 220 pages
 Celibacy: A Way of Loving, Living, and Serving, Liguori Publications, 1st edition (May 1996), 197 pages
 Psychiatry, Ministry, and Pastoral Counseling - Paperback – March 1, 1984 , 384 pages
 Celibacy in Crisis: A Secret World Revisited, Brunner-Routledge, New York and Hove 2003, 368 pages
 Living the Celibate Life: A Search for Models and Meaning, Liguori (November 2, 2004), 192 pages
 The Serpent and the Dove: celibacy in literature and life'', Greenwood Publishing Group, 2007, 262 pages.
 Abuse by Priests: Why? (Audio Cassette)

See also
James F. Colaianni
Pedophilia
Priest shortage

References

External links
Richardsipe.com
Hamline.edu
CSBSJU.edu
AAA.net.au
Arthurstreet.com
Bishop-accountability.org

Jknirp.com
Seattleweekly.com, "Breach of faith"
Seattleweekly.com, "A real charmer"
UKvocation.org
Napac.org.uk
Timberlakepublishing.com
Andrewmurray.org.au
NYtimes.com
PDX.edu
UNI.edu

Court
APH.gov.au
LAcounty.gov
Reardonlaw.com

Scholar
Sagepub.com, extract
Oxfordjournals.org
Sagepub.com, reprint

Interviews
USAtoday.com
CNN.com
CNN.com, transcripts.
Channel4.com

Books
Sex these days: essays on theology, sexuality and society by Jon Davies, Gerard Loughlin
The Silence of Sodom: Homosexuality in Modern Catholicism by Mark D. Jordan

1932 births
2018 deaths
People from Robbinsdale, Minnesota
American Benedictines
American male writers
Laicized Roman Catholic priests
20th-century American Roman Catholic priests
Writers from Minnesota
Catholics from Minnesota